Stephen K. Urice (born February 12, 1950) is a law professor at the University of Miami School of Law in Coral Gables, Florida.

Career
Urice's 1981 doctoral dissertation formed the basis of his book, Qasr Kharana in the Transjordan (1987), which presented the findings of his work as director of a Jordanian-American archaeological expedition at that early Islamic site. Urice entered Harvard Law School and graduated with the Class of 1984. 

Urice began his legal practice in the Trusts and Estates department of Milbank, Tweed, Hadley & McCloy in New York City. Three years later, he moved to Los Angeles, where he joined the trusts and estates department at Irell & Manella. Urice left the practice of law in 1991 to serve as acting director of the Frederick R. Weisman Art Foundation in Los Angeles.

An archaeologist and attorney, Urice served previously as a lecturer at University of Pennsylvania Law School and taught at UCLA School of Law. In 2003, Urice served as a visiting lecturer of public and international affairs at Woodrow Wilson School at Princeton University, teaching a seminar on the 1954 Hague Convention for the Protection of Cultural Property in the Event of Armed Conflict.

Urice is now a professor of law at the University of Miami School of Law in Coral Gables, Florida.

External links
 Official website at University of Miami School of Law

American archaeologists
American lawyers
Harvard Law School alumni
Princeton University faculty
UCLA School of Law faculty
University of Miami faculty
University of Pennsylvania faculty
Living people
1950 births
People associated with Milbank, Tweed, Hadley & McCloy